Replay is the final studio album by the English rock band The Outfield, released 2011. This was the last album that the band released before songwriter and guitarist John Spinks died from liver cancer. The lead single, "California Sun", was a regional number one AOR chart hit. A limited advanced release of the band's second single, "A Long, Long Time Ago", reached number one on Worldwide FM ClassX Radio's AOR chart in the second week of August 2011. This album also marks the return of founding drummer Alan Jackman to the band.

Track listing
All tracks written by John Spinks.
"Aladdin's Cave" – 4:32
"California Sun" – 4:01
"A Long, Long Time Ago" – 4:25
"In Your Company" – 3:33
"Who Would You Be?" – 3:10
"Shake Your Thing" – 4:39
"New York City" – 4:11
"Call It Out" – 3:41
"Process" – 3:52
"Wonderland" – 5:26
"Disraeli Years" – 4:17
"Sandman" – 4:26

Non-album and online bonus tracks
"Malibu Beach" (B-Side to California Sun Single) – 4:05
"A Little Piece of Luck" (Charity Single) – 4:34

Personnel

The Outfield
Tony Lewis – bass guitar, vocals
John Spinks – guitars, vocals
Alan Jackman – drums, percussion

Production
Produced by John Spinks, The Outfield, Brent Bitner
Executive producer – John Spinks

References

External links
 

The Outfield albums
2011 albums
Power pop albums by English artists